Chamaesphecia staudingeri is a moth of the family Sesiidae. It is found on Sicily.

References

Moths described in 1890
Sesiidae
Endemic fauna of Italy
Moths of Europe